WTIX-FM is an oldies outlet serving the New Orleans area. The station is owned by Michael A. "Michael In The Morning" Costello (under the name Fleur de Lis Broadcasting) and operates at 94.3 MHz with an ERP of 100 kW. Its city of license is Galliano, Louisiana.  Its studios are in Metairie and its transmitter is located near Port Sulphur, Louisiana.

History
Costello was program director at WRNO-FM from 1976 to 1991 and also hosted the morning show as "Michael In The Morning" (M&M). Additionally, he  hosted the Sunday night edition of The Rock 'N'Roll Hall Of Fame. He then acquired the former KLEB-FM from the Harold Callais family which was a country music outlet in 1995 and flipped it to its current oldies format. The station is modeled after the original Top 40 AM station WTIX, which was a very successful Top 40 outlet in New Orleans from the 1950s through the 1970s. He increased the transmitted power and moved the antenna from its original location to its present location in 1998 to better serve the New Orleans metro area. Mike Costello also handles GM, PD, and also hosts the morning show. Many of the jingles used on WTIX-FM are the originals used by WTIX/690 in the 1960s and 1970s. WTIX-FM also adapts a time-honored feature from the old WTIX: the "Chime Time", wherein a chime rang whenever jocks gave the time on the air. (Coincidentally, "Chime Time" was also the staple of Musicradio WABC in its heyday.)

WTIX-FM's format, Oldies, is patterned after half of WTIX's late-1980s hybrid Talk/Oldies format (before the latter switched to All-Talk in 1988). Three of the WTIX-FM disc jockeys, "Hot" Rod Glenn, Bobby Reno, and Terry Knight, also had very minor and short-term ties to the original WTIX. Terry Knight left the station several years ago.

Sgt. T-Ben's daily segment, "The News You Need Now!," which debuted in June 2004, is a tongue-in-cheek mock news report concerning local politicians, national celebrities and various topical news stories, concluding with his signature catchphrase, "Nobody cares!" And "JD The DJ," J. Douglas, veteran DJ at such stations as WPTR in Albany, KIRL in St. Louis, and WIXO-FM, WNOE and WRNO-FM in New Orleans, hosts the "Rock and Roll Flight to Midnight".

WTIX-FM 17 Choice Oldies, an album originally released on LP by The Mighty 690 in 1967, had been reissued on compact disc in 2005. Another CD, WTIX At The Beach, a compilation of summertime-themed oldies, was released in 2008, and there is a new disc, WTIX Back To The Beach, released in July 2011.

Its current slogan is "New Orleans' Oldies Station, TIX-FM."

Jocks
 Michael Costello (a.k.a. "Michael In The Morning" or simply "M&M" for short)
 Ben Walsh (a.k.a. "Sgt. T-Ben Boudreaux," with "The News You Need Now!")
 "Hot" Rod Glenn (also a DJ on the original WTIX)
 "Your Pal" Al Nassar (also a DJ on the original WTIX)
 J. Douglas (a.k.a. "JD The DJ"; once a DJ of WRNO-FM, WNOE, and WIXO)

Former jocks
 Terry Knight - also a DJ on the original WTIX.
Bruce Charles - also a DJ on the original WTIX.
     *To my knowledge there was never a Bruce Charles on the original WTIX 690-am
 Bobby Reno (also a DJ on the original WTIX. Reno died October 10, 2016 at age 72 )

References

External links
WTIX official website 

JD the DJ - J. Douglas' official site
Benny The Jokeman - Home Page - Sgt. T-Ben Boudreaux's official site

Radio stations in New Orleans
Oldies radio stations in the United States
Radio stations established in 1966